BLE or Ble may refer to:

 Ble (band), a pop-rock band from Greece
 Ble., a trade abbreviation for Bletilla, an orchid genus
 Bluetooth Low Energy, a wireless personal area network technology

Transport

Air
 Borlänge Airport, in Dalarna, Sweden, by IATA code
 Blue Line (airline), based in Paris, France, by ICAO code

Rail
 Bessemer and Lake Erie Railroad, in the United States by reporting mark
 Bramley (West Yorkshire) railway station, in Leeds, England, by National Rail code
 Brotherhood of Locomotive Engineers, a railway labor union in the United States
 Braunschweigische Landes-Eisenbahn-Gesellschaft, the German name of the Brunswick State Railway Company